The 207th Rifle Division began its combat path under unusual circumstances. It was partly formed for the first time as a standard Red Army rifle division in the spring of 1941, before the German invasion, but was never completed. A second formation began in April 1942 and was completed on June 1, after which it was sent to the Stalingrad Front. Heavily depleted in counterattacks against the north flank of German Sixth Army, by November the survivors were reassigned and the division disbanded. The 207th was formed for a third time in June 1943, and fought its way through the central part of the Soviet-German front, ending the war in the heart of Berlin in the battle for the Reichstag. The division saw postwar service in the Group of Soviet Forces in Germany.

1st Formation 
The 207th Rifle Division began forming on March 4, 1941. Very little is known about this formation:

2nd Formation 
The second 207th Rifle Division began forming in April 1942, to begin with in the North Caucasus Military District, based on a cadre from the 52nd Rifle Brigade. It did not have a commander assigned until after it moved to Ivanovo in the Moscow Military District in June. The division's primary order of battle was as follows:
 594th Rifle Regiment
 597th Rifle Regiment
 598th Rifle Regiment
 780th Artillery Regiment
The division was first assigned to the 10th Reserve Army in the Reserve of the Supreme High Command. In August it returned to the south, assigned to 24th Army in Stalingrad Front. During the following two months the 24th, along with the 66th and 1st Guards Armies, were thrown into a series of desperate and costly counterattacks against the north flank of the German "corridor" that led their positions in Stalingrad. In November the 207th was so worn down that its survivors were reassigned to help rebuild the 387th Rifle Division, and the division was officially disbanded in the Don Front on December 2.

3rd Formation
A new 207th Rifle Division was formed on June 6, 1943, in the 5th Army in Western Front, based on a cadre from the 40th Rifle Brigade and the 2nd formation of the 153rd Rifle Brigade. Its order of battle remained the same as the 2nd (and probably the 1st) formation. It inherited the Order of the Red Banner unit award that had been won by the 40th.

The division remained in 5th Army in Western Front until October, fighting towards Smolensk, until it was transferred to 10th Guards Army in the same Front. At the end of the year 10th Guards went to the 2nd Baltic Front, and in January 1944, the 207th joined the 79th Rifle Corps in 3rd Shock Army in the same Front. The division would remain in that army until postwar, and in that corps as well, apart from a temporary reassignment to 93rd Rifle Corps from Apr. - June 1944.

In December, following the Šiauliai Offensive and the Riga Offensive, 3rd Shock Army was transferred to the 1st Belorussian Front. In this Front it took part in the Vistula-Oder Offensive through Poland and eastern Germany, and the 207th distinguished itself in the conquest of eastern Pomerania, receiving the name of that German state as an honorific. During the Battle of Berlin in late April 1945, 3rd Shock helped outflank the north side of the city and 79th Corps opened long-range artillery fire on it on April 20. The next day, elements of the army, and several others, reached the suburbs and entered difficult urban combat. On April 29, against fanatic resistance, 79th Corps began the symbolic struggle for the Reichstag. The 207th supported its comrades of the 150th Rifle Division as they fought through the building and hoisted the Red Banner over it on the 30th.

The soldiers of the 207th Rifle Division ended the war with the official title of 207th Rifle, Pomerania, Order of the Red Banner, Order of Suvorov Division. (Russian: 207-я стрелковая Померанская Краснознамённая ордена Суворова дивизия.) It went on to serve postwar with its army and its corps in the Group of Soviet Forces in Germany.

After a period of being renamed the 32nd Rifle Division, it became the 32nd Motor Rifle Division on 17 May 1957, and then the 207th Motor Rifle Division in 1965. After being stationed at Stendal from 1957 to 1991, it was briefly moved to Yarmolintsy, Khmelnitskiy Oblast, before being disbanded in 1992.

References

 

207
Military units and formations established in 1941
Military units and formations disestablished in 1955
Infantry divisions of the Soviet Union